Ronald Bertram Chesney Burns (9 October 1903 – 7 June 1985) was an Indian sprinter. He competed in the men's 100 metres at the 1928 Summer Olympics.

References

External links
 

1903 births
1985 deaths
Athletes (track and field) at the 1928 Summer Olympics
Indian male sprinters
Olympic athletes of India
Anglo-Indian people
Athletes from West Bengal
Indian emigrants to Australia
Australian people of Anglo-Indian descent